Twelve ships of the French Navy have been named Cérès:

Ships named Cérès 

 , an 18-gun corvette taken from the British.
 , a 32-gun frigate, lead ship of her class 
 , an  launched in 1795 renamed Enfant de la Patrie in 1797 and wrecked in 1798 
 , a Venetian-made frigate, bore the name Cérès during her career. 
 , a 40-gun frigate, formerly the Napolitan Cerere 
 , a 40-gun frigate 
 , a 52-gun frigate, bore the name Cérès during her career.  
 , an 18-gun Bayonnaise-class corvette 
 , a screw frigate 
 , a  launched in 1938 and scuttled in 1942 
 , an auxiliary transport 
 , a Circé-class minesweeper

Notes and references
Notes

References

Bibliography
 
 

French Navy ship names